The 1987 Winnipeg Blue Bombers finished in 1st place in the East Division with a 12–6 record. They hosted the East Final, but lost to the Toronto Argonauts. This was the Blue Bombers first season in the East Division, having been moved from the West Division to replace the Montreal Alouettes, who folded just prior to the regular season.

Offseason

CFL Draft

Preseason

Regular season

Standings

Schedule

Playoffs

East Final

Awards

1987 CFL All-Stars

References

Winnipeg Blue Bombers seasons
1987 Canadian Football League season by team